Mosaic is a studio album by the band Wovenhand. It was released in 2006 on Glitterhouse Records and Sounds Familyre.

Track listings

"Breathing Bull"
"Winter Shaker"
"Swedish Purse"
"Twig"
"Whistling Girl"
"Elktooth"
"Bible and Bird"
"Dirty Blue"
"Slota Prow - Full Armour"
"Truly Golden"
"Deerskin Doll"
"Little Raven""Shun" (hidden track)

Personnel
David Eugene Edwards - vocals, guitar, bass
Daniel McMahon - piano
Ordy Garrison - drums
Elin Palmer - strings

References

2006 albums
Wovenhand albums